Rifugio Federico Chabod is a mountain hut in the Graian Alps in Aosta Valley, Italy, at an altitude of . It is owned by the Club Alpino Italiano, and named after Federico Chabod, a historian, politician, and mountain climber from the Aosta Valley.

External links
 Rifugio Federico Chabod

Mountain huts in the Alps
Mountain huts in Aosta Valley
Mountain huts of Club Alpino Italiano